is a Japanese anime television series and the ninth anime series in the Digimon franchise. The series premiered on Fuji TV on October 3, 2021.

Plot
In a relatively near future, an innovative technology has emerged. On social networks, rumors are circulating about strange phenomena whose authenticity is unknown, referred to as "Hologram Ghosts". Hiro Amanokawa is a middle school freshman at Hazakura Academy, who by activating a mysterious device left behind by his father called the "Digivice -V-", has the effect of making unknown creatures that cannot be seen by ordinary people, the Digimon, visible to his eyes.

Since the day he met Gammamon, a mischievous Digimon entrusted to him by his father, Hiro is caught up in various strange phenomena: A man with a sewn mouth steals time from human beings, a mummy wanders around every night and kidnaps humans... The hologram ghosts are all around us and take us for target. From now on, here is the story of this other side of the world that nobody is aware of. Alongside their friends Ruli Tsukiyono and Angoramon, and later Kiyoshirō Higashimitarai and Jellymon, Hiro and Gammamon dive into the mysterious world where these creatures live.

Characters

Main Characters

A 13-year-old who attends the private school Hazakura Academy, an inquisitive and relatable youth who never turns down a request. He is a reliable person who can do most of the things on his own that others often rely on. He's very curious and started getting interested in Digimon after meeting Gammamon, whom he met through his father, Hokuto Amanokawa. Due to his upbringing, he tends to suppress his childish side while being energetic and caring for others. He has a scar on his left ear.

Hiro's partner, he is a white Ceratopsian Digimon with small wings on his back. Gammamon possesses multiple Champion-level forms including Betel Gammamon, Kaus Gammamon and Wezen Gammamon, each with their strengths and weaknessess. Also there is a dark form with a vicious and sadistic demeanor called Gulus Gammamon who manifests himself when Gammamon's heart is filled with sadness or rage. He later gains the power to evolve further into the Ultimate-level Canoweissmon and the Mega-level Siriusmon. At the end of the series, Gulus Gammamon evolves into the Ultimate-level Regulusmon and is revealed to be the one who originally created a virus called GRB (Gamma Realm Burst) to make the strong Digimon devour the weak Digimon, and to ravage the Digital World.

Ruli is a first-year middle school student attending a combined middle and high school for girls. A friendly 13-year-old who attends an all-girls' school and runs a popular occult-related social media account. She is sociable and has lots of friends. She looks for things that suit her taste and wants to stick her nose into everything. Furthermore, she plays the piano, which Angoramon likes to listen to. Although she is an outgoing girl who is skilled and can do pretty much anything, she actually struggles to find things that she deems appropriate and therefore feels bored. 

Ruli's partner who is a large rabbit-like Beast Digimon with a pacifistic personality, initially following Ruli as he enjoyed her piano playing. He can evolve into the Champion-level Symbare Angoramon, the Ultimate-level Lamortmon and the Mega-Level Diarbbitmon.

A 14-year-old genius who graduated from an American school and currently attends Hazakura Academy so that he can enjoy living as a regular boy. He is afraid of ghosts and always look for talismans to ward them off. Usually having a condescending and cowardly manner, Kiyoshirō occasionally becomes brave and level-headed when put against a corner. He appears to have split-personality.

A jellyfish-like Mollusk Digimon and Kiyoshirō's partner, whom she likes to scare and cause mischief towards. She can evolve into the Champion-level Tesla Jellymon, the Ultimate-level Thetismon and the Mega-Level Amphimon.

 A jetpack themed Digimon who helped Gammamon rescue Hiro when he was under the influence of a Doumon. He is looking for Hiro, using his student ID, and keeps looking for Hiro for a long time, unaware that the already found him. When Hiro reveals that he is the person Espimon is looking for, Espimon becomes Hiro's second partner, able to evolve into the Champion-level Hover Espimon.

Digimon

The following Digimon have appeared as ghosts that Hiro and Gammamon have to deal with:

A clock-themed Digimon who initially plagued humans with his time-based abilities, but becomes an ally to Hiro's group.

A mummy Digimon who becomes an ally to Hiro's group following a misunderstanding about his methods of healing humans.

A vampire Digimon who caused trouble before aligning himself with Myotismon, only to be destroyed by him for defying his orders to not harm Ruli.

A yatagarasu-like Digimon who controls birds at night.

 A mutant Digimon who aids Hiro's group before being killed by Sealsdramon, his death causing Gammamon to gain the ability to digivolve to GulusGammamon.

A cyborg-like reptile Digimon who is a serial killer, and is responsible for the many deaths of innocent Digimon, and also responsible for killing Bokomon, before being killed by Gammamon as GulusGammamon to avenge Bokomon's death.

An intelligent jorōgumo Digimon with a temperamental disposition, feeding on human brains before being destroyed by Gammamon as GulusGammamon.

A humanoid plant-like creature Digimon who attempts to turn humans into Ajatarmons like herself, before killing herself after a battle between Hiro and friends.

An aggressive and evil vampire-like Ultimate-level undead Digimon who aspires to take over the human world, acquiring followers while establishing the trendsetter company Scarlatto Vento under the guise of Kyogoku Aviel, before being defeated by Gammamon as Canoweissmon and turning into a bat.

A humanoid white tiger-like Digimon who can turn humans into water.

 A succubus/ vampire themed mega leveled Digimon who infected several humans and Digimon. Gammamon was able to hold her off as Siriusmon, ending in a draw. Lilithmon decided to call off her attack, and offered Siriusmon a place at her side. While Siriusmon said no, and as she retreated, Lilithmon wondered if the other one would agree.

Other
Akane
Ruli's Teacher. She has brown eyes and brown hair, and she wears a yellow t-shirt with a star on it.

Ruli's friend and classmate, she has yellow eyes and brown hair.

Ruli's friend and classmate, she has blue eyes and black ponytail hair.
Nana
Ruli's friend and classmate, she has brown eyes and dark brown hair with twin tails.
Moe
Ruli's friend and classmate, she has blue eyes and black hair.
Yuina
A little girl Kiyoshiro saves.

A little girl who's Aoi's friend once.

Hiro's father, who's been trapped in the digital world.

Production

Background

Digimon Ghost Game was officially announced at Bandai's DigiFes 2021 event on August 1, 2021 with a first teaser visual for the series, by Tenya Yabuno. The series is directed by Kimitoshi Chioka and Masato Mitsuka, with Masashi Sogo supervising series' scripts, Tenya Yabuno designing characters and Mariko Itō adapting those designs for animation, Kenji Watanabe designing the Digimon and Cho Shinozuka adapting those designs for animation. 

In the October issue of Shueisha's V Jump magazine on August 19, 2021, the presentation specifically stated that Ghost Game is going to be the franchise's first horror-themed entry. The creation of this series required putting thought into how to reinterpret the Digimon and the background lore that Bandai has created, for the horror context. New Digimon have been created specifically for this new series and old Digimon that can fit in and play an active role in this story, not only through their background but also in their aspect, would make an appearance. In this iteration, Digimon are seen as poltergeists from Japanese folklore ; the first promotional poster introduced them as "Hologram... ?" and "Ghost... ? ". The series is produced for an episodic format.

Toei Animation decided to make Digimon Ghost Game a villain of the week show as they found that children of the generation of the year the series came out have low attention spans due to Youtube and TikTok and were worried that if they made a show with an extended plot they would get bored after only a few minutes and stop watching the show entirely.

Development
The announcement was originally leaked on Chinese social media on July 28, 2021. On August 7, 2021, the teaser visual was updated on the official website with the only difference being, Kiyoshirō's left hand covered with bandages. On September 3, 2021, Shueisha's Saikyo Jump magazine announced Digimon Dreamers, unrelated to the anime, with a first illustration from the monthly illustrated by Yabuno featuring Hiro, the main character of Ghost Game, with goggles. The design of the protagonist wasn't finalized at the time of submission, and then changed to an original character in a new illustration revealed by the author via Twitter on September 4, 2021. On September 10, 2021, the official website revealed the cast, the airing date, as well as the main visual featuring the characters in their school uniforms, design by Mariko Itō.

Broadcast and distribution

The first trailer for the series was shown during the 65th episode of Digimon Adventure:. The series premiered on Fuji TV on October 3, 2021, set to start after Adventure: in the same timeslot. Digimon Ghost Game is broadcast on Fuji Television, and available for streaming on TVer, U-NEXT, Bandai Channel, Anime Hodai and Docomo Anime Store in Japan. The series is set to end with its 68th episode on March 26, 2023.

Digimon Ghost Game is distributed simultaneously by Crunchyroll in North America, Central America, South America, Europe, Africa, Oceania, the MENA and CIS zones with English, Spanish, French, Portuguese, Arabic, Italian, German and Russian (1–21) subtitles for premium members within the first week of release. Starting in spring 2022, new episodes are available by subscription only, the first twenty-one episodes remaining available to all users. The anime is also simulcast on VRV in the United States. In France, the anime is also available on Anime Digital Network and J-One.

On March 6, 2022, Toei Animation announced a broadcast hiatus for the following Sunday due to the Nagoya Women's Marathon. On March 7, 2022, Toei Animation and Digimon Ghost Game's social network revealed that they had been affected by a computer hacking attack, the series produced by the studio faced postponements starting on March 20, 2022. In Japan, Fuji TV decided to rebroadcast the first episode of Digimon Ghost Game on March 20 and a selection of episodes the following weeks.

Soundtrack 
The composer of the Japanese version is Kow Otani. Wienners performs the opening theme "FACTION", with Aiiro Apollo performs the series' ending theme "Pedal". A new ending for the anime started airing from July 3, 2022. The song, "Monster Disco", written by Shikao Suga and arranged by Hyadain, started from episode 32. The fifth ending theme from episodes 45 to 57 is "STRAWBERRY" by kobore. The sixth ending theme from episodes 58 onwards is "Take Me Maybe" by Penthouse.

References

External links
  
 

2021 anime television series debuts
Adventure anime and manga
Crunchyroll anime
Digimon anime and manga
Fuji TV original programming
Supernatural anime and manga
Toei Animation television